Pi Omega Pi is a scholastic honor society recognizing academic achievement among students in the field of business education.

The society was founded at Northeast Missouri State Teachers College in Kirksville on  June 13, 1923, and admitted to the Association of College Honor Societies in 1965.

Pi Omega Pi honor society has 20 active chapters across the United States.

See also
 Alpha Kappa Psi , professional
 Delta Sigma Pi , professional
 Phi Gamma Nu , professional, originally women's
 Phi Chi Theta , professional, originally women's
 Epsilon Eta Phi , merged into 

 Beta Gamma Sigma , honor, (AACSB schools)
 Delta Mu Delta , honor, (ACBSP)
 Sigma Beta Delta , honor, (non-AACSB schools)

 Alpha Beta Gamma , honor, (2-yr schools)
 Kappa Beta Delta , honor, (2-yr schools, (ACBSP)

 Association of College Honor Societies

External links
 
  ACHS Pi Omega Pi entry

Association of College Honor Societies
Honor societies
Student organizations established in 1923
1923 establishments in Missouri